The 1880 Open Championship was the 20th Open Championship, held 9 April 1880 at Musselburgh Links, Musselburgh, East Lothian, Scotland. Bob Ferguson won the Championship, by five strokes from runner-up Peter Paxton.

A number of players were absent because of the short notice given for the competition. Jamie Anderson, winner of the previous three Open Championships was amongst those that were missing. Good weather brought out many spectators. The Championship was played over four rounds of the nine-hole Musselburgh  course.

Andrew Kirkaldy scored a hole-in-one at the eighth hole in his second round and almost repeated the feat in his third round.

After three rounds Bob Ferguson was tied for the lead with Peter Paxton with Ned Cosgrove only a shot behind. In the final round Ferguson scored 39 to Paxton's and Cosgrove's 44s to win by five strokes.

Final leaderboard
Source:

Friday, 9 April 1880

Generally scores relate to first 18 holes and second 18 holes. Individual round scores mostly not recorded.

References

External links
Musselburgh Links 1880 (Official site)

The Open Championship
Golf tournaments in Scotland
Open Championship
Open Championship
Open Championship